Libor Hájek (born 4 February 1998) is a Czech professional ice hockey defenceman for the Hartford Wolf Pack of the American Hockey League (AHL). He was selected by the Tampa Bay Lightning, in the second round, 37th overall, in the 2016 NHL Entry Draft.

Playing career
Hájek made his Czech Extraliga (ELH) debut playing 17 games with HC Kometa Brno during the 2014–15 Czech Extraliga season. In opting to continue his development in the CHL, Hájek was selected second overall in the 2015 CHL Import Draft by the Saskatoon Blades of the WHL.

At the completion of his second season with the Blades, Hájek was signed to a three-year, entry-level contract with the Tampa Bay Lightning on March 21, 2017. He immediately joined primary affiliate, the Syracuse Crunch of the AHL on an amateur try-out to play out the remainder of the 2016–17 season.

On 26 February 2018, Hájek was traded to the New York Rangers, along with Vladislav Namestnikov, Brett Howden, and two draft picks, for Ryan McDonagh and J. T. Miller. Hájek recorded his first career NHL assist off a goal by Mika Zibanejad during the 2019–20 season opener against the Winnipeg Jets on 3 October.

On 13 November 2020, Hájek was loaned to HC Kometa Brno of the Czech Extraliga (ELH).

On 7 September 2021, the Rangers re-signed Hájek to a one-year contract. On 12 July 2022, he was signed to a one-year contract extension. He spent most of the 2022–23 season with the Rangers but was assigned to Hartford on 10 February 2023.

Career statistics

Regular season and playoffs

International

References

External links

1998 births
Living people
Czech expatriate ice hockey players in Canada
Czech expatriate ice hockey players in the United States
Czech ice hockey defencemen
Hartford Wolf Pack players
HC Kometa Brno players
New York Rangers players
People from Žďár nad Sázavou District
Regina Pats players
Saskatoon Blades players
Syracuse Crunch players
Tampa Bay Lightning draft picks
Sportspeople from the Vysočina Region